Emmanuel Ogura (born 13 May 2002) is a Ghanaian professional footballer who plays as a goalkeeper for FC Nordsjælland.

Career 
Ogura started his career with Right to Dream Academy before joining FC Nordsjælland. He made his debut on 28 September 2021 in a 5–1 loss to FC Copenhagen.

References

External links 
 
 

Living people
2002 births
Association football goalkeepers
Ghanaian footballers
Right to Dream Academy players
FC Nordsjælland players
Ghanaian expatriate footballers
Ghanaian expatriate sportspeople in Denmark
Expatriate men's footballers in Denmark